Yu-Ju Chen (陳玉如) is a Taiwanese proteomics research scientist, who leads international projects in proteogenomics.

Education 
Yu-Ju Chen received a PhD in physical chemistry at Iowa State University in 1997, under the direction of Cheuk-Yiu Ng. She completed post-doctoral research at Ames Laboratory in 1997, and then at Yuan-Pern Lee's group at National Tsing Hua University in 1999.

Career 

Chen began her career at the Institute of Chemistry of Academia Sinica as assistant research fellow in 1999. She was the Director of the Institute of Chemistry from 2013 to 2019, and is currently a Distinguished Research Fellow. She is also an adjunct professor at National Taiwan University, National Chiayi University, National Taiwan Ocean University, and National Chung Hsing University. She conducts research in mass spectrometry-based bioinformatics, in relation to understanding diseases such as cancer.

Since 2016, Chen has participated in the US Cancer Moonshot Initiative, providing proteogenomics expertise as representative of Academia Sinica. She is the project investigator for the Taiwan Cancer Moonshot Project, which analyzes multiomic data related to gastric cancer. She participates in the Chromosome-centric Human Proteome Project, and is the group lead of chromosome 4.

Chen served as president for the Human Proteome Organization (2021-2022), the Taiwan Proteomics Society, and the Taiwan Society for Mass Spectrometry (2012-2015). She has been a council member of the Asia Oceania Human Proteome Organization since 2019. She current serves as executive director of the Taiwan Proteomics Society (2021-2023), and the Taiwan Society for Mass Spectrometry. She served on editorial boards of European Journal of Mass Spectrometry, Journal of Proteome Research, and Frontiers in Analytical Chemistry, and currently serves on the Executive Advisory Board of Proteomics.

Awards 

 2020 Taiwan Society for Mass Spectrometry Medal
 2011 Taiwan Society for Mass Spectrometry Outstanding Scholar Award
 2007 Federation of Asian Chemical Societies Distinguished Young Chemists Award
 2006 Chinese Chemical Society Outstanding Young Investigator Award

References 

Iowa State University alumni
Academic staff of the National Taiwan University
Academic staff of the National Chiayi University
Academic staff of the National Chung Hsing University
Living people
Women physical chemists
Taiwanese women scientists
Year of birth missing (living people)